The Tampere Bus Station is a bus station in the city center of Tampere, Finland, located in the Ratina district along the Hatanpää Highway. It takes about 20 minutes by bus to Tampere Airport from the bus station. When completed, it was also the largest bus station in the Nordic countries. 

The bus station was at its busiest in the late 1960s, with around 470 departures on normal weekdays. By the end of the 1980s, the number had shrunk to less than 400, mainly due to an increase in the car traffic, but also partly due to the relocation of some local routes to the Pyynikintori square. When the cargo handling facilities at the bus station had become cramped, a new freight station was built between the bus station and the Tampere Highway, which was opened in early 1985. The bus station also had the office of  until 1984, when all the company's operations moved to new premises in the Sarankulma's industrial area.  

Between 1995 and 2004, the relocation of the bus station to the Central Station was examined in several stages in connection with the national transport hub project. The work also examined the model of a decentralized transport hub, where the bus station would remain in the Ratina district. On 31 May 2004, the City Council's planning department decided that the bus station would remain in its original location. A major renovation of the Tampere bus station began in December 2007, which lasted about a year, where the departure platforms were moved to the east of the station, and the parking spaces for buses were removed. The renovation was completed in late 2008, when the retail premises at the north end of the building were completed. The construction of the future Ratina shopping center was taken into account in the renovation and renovation work. The shopping center was built in 2015–2018 between Ratina Stadium and the bus station, and at the same time the Vuolteenkatu street, which passed through the shopping center site, was moved just behind the bus station. The bus station also provides direct access to the shopping center via escalators.

See also
 Sori Square
 Tampere Railway Station

References

External links

 Tampereen linja-autoasema – Visit Tampere (in Finnish)
 The Tampere Bus Station – VirtualTampere

Buildings and structures in Tampere
Bus stations in Finland
Keskusta (Tampere)
Transport in Tampere